Kura Rock or Kura Stone (Kurinskiy Kamen), is an islet off the coast of Azerbaijan.

Geography
Kura Rock is small islet with a maximum length of 0.18 km. The Borisova Bank is located to the west of this islet.

Although quite far from Baku, this islet is considered part of the Baku Archipelago.
Administratively it belongs to the Aran Region.

See also

Fedor Ivanovich Soimonov

References

External links
Caspian Sea Biodiversity Project

Islands of Azerbaijan
Islands of the Caspian Sea
Uninhabited islands of Azerbaijan